Matrix element may refer to:

 The (scalar) entries of a matrix.  
 Matrix element (physics), the value of a linear operator (especially a modified Hamiltonian) in quantum theory
 Matrix coefficient, a type of function in representation theory
 Element (software), free and open-source software instant messaging client implementing the Matrix protocol.